The 1959–60 season was Blackpool F.C.'s 52nd season (49th consecutive) in the Football League. They competed in the 22-team Division One, then the top tier of English football, finishing eleventh, mid-table.

Ray Charnley was the club's top scorer for the second consecutive season, with eighteen goals.

Hugh Kelly retired at the end of the season after seventeen years of service for Blackpool, his only professional club. George Farm left mid season to join Queen of the South after becoming the first player to make 500 first team appearances for Blackpool.

Table

Notes

References

Blackpool F.C.
Blackpool F.C. seasons